Drummin is a small village in County Mayo, Ireland, near the town of Westport.

The village has a church, St. Mary's, a national (primary) school, and a public house. Drummin National School, also known as Scoil Náisiúnta Coill Mór, had 20 pupils enrolled as of 2010. The area previously had a post office, but this has since closed.

Situated close to Croagh Patrick, Drummin is known for its scenery and rumours about gold.

See also
 List of towns and villages in Ireland

References

Towns and villages in County Mayo